Devils Tooth is a summit in Idaho County, Idaho, in the United States.

Devils Tooth was named from Nez Perce mythology.

References

Mountains of Idaho County, Idaho
Mountains of Idaho